West Eminence is an unincorporated community in Shannon County, in the U.S. state of Missouri.

History
A post office called West Eminence was established in 1910, and remained in operation until 1957. The community lies west of Eminence, hence the name.

References

Unincorporated communities in Shannon County, Missouri
Unincorporated communities in Missouri